Vrontou (Greek: Βροντού) is a town of the former Municipality of Dio, which is part of the municipality of Dio-Olympos, in the Pieria regional unit, Central Macedonia, Greece, at an altitude of 120 meters, with 1,902 inhabitants (census 2011). There are several medieval and post-medieval churches in Vrontou.

An impressive and spectacular event is the carnival of Vrontou, that take place every year.

References

Οικισμός Παλαιάς Βροντούς

Populated places in Pieria (regional unit)